Lunga vita a Sto is the first compilation by Italian rapper Ghali, released on 24 November 2017 by Sto Records.

On 25 September 2020, the album was also released for the first time in CD and LP formats.

Tracks

Rankings

References

External links 

 
 
 

Compilation albums by Italian artists
2017 compilation albums
Trap music albums